Sultan Yusuf Sharifuddin Muzaffar Shah was appointed as the 27th Sultan of Perak to replace Sultan Abdullah Muhammad Shah II who reigned from year 1874 to 1877. He was the son of the late Sultan Abdullah Muhammad Shah I (22nd Sultan of Perak). During the reign of Sultan Jaafar Mua'azzam Shah (died in 1865), and also during the reign of Sultan Ali Al-Mukammal Inayat Shah, he was not elected to be the Raja Bendahara although he was eligible and entitled. This is because many rulers and officials of Perak do not like him. When Raja Muda Raja Abdullah was elected to be the 26th Sultan of Perak, he was appointed as the Raja Muda to strengthen his position, and at that time he was residing in Senggang.

Regency and Becoming Sultan 
In 1877, Sultan Abdullah Muhammad Shah II went to Singapore for being called by the British Government in connection with the investigation of the murder of J.W.W. Birch in Pasir Salak, he was made Regent of Perak and he moved to Sayong.

Raja Idris Shah I ibni Almarhum Raja Bendahara Alang Iskandar was allowed to leave Perak from Singapore to help his in-laws, Raja Yusuf was appointed Regent of Perak, while Raja Idris was appointed as Raja Bendahara Perak.

Following this, a State Council (or better known in English as the 'Perak State Council') whose members consisted of Raja Yusuf (Regent) as President, Hugh Low (British Resident), Raja Idris, Kapitan Chung Keng Kwee (Chairman of Chinese Ho Kuan or Hai San) and Kapitan Chin Ah Yam (Chairman of the Chinese Group Si Kuan or Ghi Hin) were formed. The first conference of the Council was held in Kuala Kangsar on 10 September 1877 to negotiate the state government's policies.

During his time as Regent, many tin mines were opened in the Kinta area. The Chinese have come to the Kinta area to work in tin mines. Likewise, the people of the Malay race from Sumatra, Java and Kalimantan came to Perak to seek work in the mines. In June 1885, the first railroad in Malaya from Taiping to Port Weld (now known as Kuala Sepetang) was built and operated. As stated above, on 7 October 1886, he was proclaimed Sultan of Perak and resided in Sayong Tebing. At the same time, Raja Bendahara Raja Idris was appointed as Raja Muda Perak and later became his successor.

Death 
Sultan Yusuf Sharifuddin Muzaffar Shah ruled the State of Perak for only ten months, and died on 26 July 1887 in Sayong. He was posthumously conferred Marhum Ghafirullah. The original tomb was located at Sayong Tebing but was transferred to the Sayong Tengah Mosque area.

References 

 http://sultan.perak.gov.my/index.php/informasi-kesultanan/senarai-sultan-perak

1887 deaths
Sultans of Perak